Moss is a small, soft, non-vascular plant that does not have flowers or seeds.

Moss may also refer to:

Places

United Kingdom
 Moss, Argyll and Bute, a location in Scotland
 Moss, Highland, a location in Scotland
 Moss, South Yorkshire, England
 Moss, Wrexham, a location in Wales
 Moss Valley, Wrexham, Wales
 The Moss, a brook in England

United States
 Moss Landing, California or Moss, California
 Moss, Mississippi
 Moss, Tennessee
 Moss, West Virginia
 Moss Hill (Massachusetts), a mountain in Barnstable County, Massachusetts

Elsewhere
 Moss (Martian crater)
 Moss, Norway

People
 Moss (given name)
 Moss (surname)

Arts, entertainment, and media

Fictional characters
 Maurice Moss, a character from the British sitcom The IT Crowd
 Moss people, forest-dwelling creatures in German folklore
 Moss-Man, a fictional character from the Masters of the Universe franchise

Music
 Moss (Mike Gordon album), a 2010 album by Mike Gordon
 Moss (Maya Hawke album), a 2022 album by Maya Hawke
 Moss (band), a UK doom metal band

Other arts, entertainment, and media
 Moss (film), a 2010 South Korean film
 Moss (video game), a 2018 video game
 "Moss", a strip in the British comic Buster
 Moss, a Korean webtoon by Yoon Tae-ho

Plants
 Clubmoss, a pteridophyte plant
 Spanish moss, a flowering bromeliad plant that grows hanging from tree branches
 Spikemoss, a pteridophyte plant

Other uses
 Moss (language), a musical language designed by Jackson Moore
 Moss Bros, a menswear outfitters in the United Kingdom
 Moss Brothers Aircraft, an English aircraft manufacturer (1936–1955)
 Moss FK, a Norwegian football club
 Tupolev Tu-126 (NATO reporting name: Moss), a Soviet AWACS aircraft
 Moss, a common term for a peat bog in northern England

See also
 Mosses (disambiguation)
 Irish moss (disambiguation)
 MOS (disambiguation)
 MOSS (disambiguation)
 Mosse (disambiguation)